Sir William Sambach (c. l601-1653) was an English-born lawyer and politician of the seventeenth century who spent much of his career in Ireland, but was driven back to England by the political turmoil of the 1640s, and died there.

Background
He was the son of John Sambach of Broadway, Worcestershire and Elizabeth Aston, daughter of Sir Edward Aston of Tixall, Staffordshire and his second wife Anne Lucy, daughter of Sir Thomas  Lucy, and sister of Walter Aston, 1st Lord Aston of Forfar. The Astons were one of the most prominent Roman Catholic families in England, but the Sambachs, as far as is known, conformed to the Church of England. His parents' marriage took place in 1600.

His surname is probably a variant of Sandbach. The Sambach family has been settled at Broadway for some generations. Since that family preserved a collection of his papers it is likely that they were related to the Sandbachs of Tarporley, Cheshire, later famous as the owners of Hafodunos Hall.

Career

Little is known of his early career, but he probably arrived in Ireland in 1633 with Thomas Wentworth, 1st Earl of Strafford, the Lord Lieutenant of Ireland, to whom he seems to have been close. He became Recorder of Carrickfergus and then Second Serjeant in 1637. Unusually he was allowed to hold both offices at once, probably because his salary as Serjeant was thought to be inadequate.

In 1640 he was elected to the Irish House of Commons as member for Carrickfergus and in the same year became Solicitor General for Ireland. After the downfall and execution of Strafford for treason in 1641, Sambach continued to defend his policies; during the comprehensive attack by the Irish Parliament on Strafford's rule known as "the Queries", Sambach was one of the few MPs to speak in Strafford's defence, and to denounce the Queries. Precisely when he stepped down as Solicitor General is unclear: in the confusion of the times the office simply seems to have lapsed, and he was not replaced until 1657.

During the Irish Rebellion of 1641 he remained a committed Royalist, and by his own account suffered much damage to his property as a result. He lived at Balyna, near Moyvalley, County Kildare: in 1642 he petitioned the Crown for redress for the great loss he had suffered, which he estimated at £33800, an enormous sum at the time.

He had returned to England by 1649, when he purchased an estate at Bretforton in Worcestershire. A much later lawsuit suggests that he also had an estate at Evesham. He is heard of acting as a justice of the peace in that county in 1651, which suggests that, like many former Royalists, he had made his peace with the Cromwellian regime. He died in 1653.

Family

He was married, but little is known about his wife, except that she outlived him and was buried at the older Sambach family home at Broadway in 1670. As well as (probably) a son, he had at least one daughter, whose first name is unknown: she married John Moore of Croghan, County Offaly, eldest son of Thomas Moore and Margaret Forth, daughter of Sir Ambrose Forth, and had five children:

one surviving son Thomas, who was the father of John Moore, 1st Baron Moore, and grandfather of Charles Moore, 1st Earl of Charleville
Margaret, who married Richard Woodfall
Jane, who married Geoffrey Lyons of Killeen, County Laois
two sons who died in infancy

A lawsuit entitled Sambach v Sambach in 1707 concerned the right of a small boy called William Sambach to possession of Broadway and Evesham, which had belonged to his father: it is likely that he was a descendant of Sir William.

References

Solicitors-General for Ireland
Members of the Parliament of Ireland (pre-1801) for County Antrim constituencies
Irish MPs 1639–1649
1653 deaths
People from Evesham
Serjeants-at-law (Ireland)
Politicians from Worcestershire